Rinehart is an unincorporated community in Harrison County, in the U.S. state of West Virginia.

History
A post office called Rinehart was established in 1901, and remained in operation until 1953. The community was named after Hollis Rinehart, the builder of a nearby railroad tunnel.

References

Unincorporated communities in Harrison County, West Virginia
Unincorporated communities in West Virginia